The 1955–56 Spartan League season was the 38th in the history of Spartan League. The league consisted of 15 teams.

League table

The division featured 15 teams, 14 from last season and 1 new team:
 Welwyn Garden City, from London League

References

1955–56
9